Amanda Anne Milling (born 12 March 1975) is a British politician serving as Member of Parliament (MP) for Cannock Chase since the 2015 general election. She served as Minister without Portfolio in the UK cabinet and, alongside Ben Elliot, as Co-Chairman of the Conservative Party from February 2020 to September 2021. She also served as Minister of State for Asia and the Middle East from September 2021 to September 2022. She previously worked in market research. Milling lives at Rugeley in her constituency.

Early life and career
Milling was born on 12 March 1975 in Burton upon Trent, Staffordshire, England. She was privately educated at Moreton Hall School, and studied economics and statistics at University College London, graduating in 1997. Milling joined the Conservative Party while at university. Following university, Milling joined market research firm SW1 Research. She left the company in 1999 to join Quaestor where she eventually became a director. Milling then worked as head of clients for Optimisa Research between 2010 and 2014.

Political career
Milling was elected as a Conservative councillor for the Helmshore ward on the Rossendale Borough Council in Lancashire in 2009. Three years later she was promoted to deputy group leader on the council. She resigned her seat in 2014 after her selection as the Conservative candidate for the Cannock Chase constituency in Staffordshire. The incumbent Conservative MP Aidan Burley had previously announced that he would be standing down at the next election.

In the 2015 general election, she was elected with a majority of 4,923 (10.5%). The following year, Milling was one of a number of MPs investigated by the Electoral Commission and the police for allegedly breaching spending regulations in the election. The Commission fined the Conservative Party £70,000 in March 2017 for "significant failures" in its reporting of campaign spending. After completing their investigation, the police referred the matter to the Crown Prosecution Service who concluded that, although there was evidence of inaccuracy in the reporting of spending, they would not take further action as it was not clear that candidates or agents had knowingly acted dishonestly.

During the 2015–2017 parliament, Milling served on the Business, Energy and Industrial Strategy Committee, Education, Skills and the Economy Sub-Committee. Parliamentary enquiries that she was part of include the collapse of BHS, and the working practices at Sports Direct. She also served on Bill Committees including for the Welfare Reform and Work Bill and Policing and Crime Bill.

Milling supported the UK remaining within the European Union in the 2016 UK EU membership referendum. After the referendum, she helped to organise Boris Johnson's 2016 Conservative leadership campaign. In the 2017 general election, she was re-elected with an increased majority of 8,391 (17.6%). She was made an assistant government whip during the reshuffle on 9 January 2018. Milling voted for then Prime Minister Theresa May's Brexit withdrawal agreement in early 2019.

After the election of Johnson as prime minister in July 2019, she was appointed as Deputy Chief Whip and Treasurer of the Household in his ministry. She voted for Johnson's Brexit withdrawal agreement in October 2019. In the 2019 general election, she was re-elected with an increased majority of 19,879 (42.9%). As part of the 2020 cabinet reshuffle, Milling was promoted to Chairman of the Conservative Party and Minister without Portfolio.

At the 2021 British cabinet reshuffle, Milling was made the new Minister of State for Asia and the Middle East, making her the only cabinet minister to leave the cabinet whilst remaining part of the government. In April-May 2022 she was sent to the British Virgin Islands following the arrest of former premier, Andrew Fahie, on drugs running charges in the United States. The idea of direct rule from the UK was being considered but without the support of the acting premier Natalio Wheatley.

Milling endorsed Nadhim Zahawi during the July 2022 Conservative Party leadership election.

Notes

References

External links

1975 births
Alumni of University College London
Conservative Party (UK) MPs for English constituencies
Female members of the Parliament of the United Kingdom for English constituencies
Living people
People educated at Moreton Hall School
21st-century English women
21st-century English people
21st-century British women politicians
UK MPs 2015–2017
UK MPs 2017–2019
UK MPs 2019–present